Mark Donohue (born 2 June 1967 in Portsmouth, United Kingdom) is a British-Australian linguist. He deals with the description of Austronesian, Papuan, and Sino-Tibetan languages.

He obtained a B.A. in linguistics at the Australian National University in Canberra. In 1996, he defended his doctoral dissertation entitled The Tukang Besi language of Southeast Sulawesi, Indonesia. From 2009 to 2017, he was an associate professor at the Australian National University. In 2017, he was employed by the Living Tongues Institute for Endangered Languages.

Publications
 Bajau: A symmetrical Austronesian language (1996)
 Tone systems in New Guinea (1997)
 Typology and linguistic areas (2004)
 The Papuan language of Tambora (2007)
 A grammar of Tukang Besi (2011)

References

Living people
1967 births
Linguists of Papuan languages
Linguists of Lower Mamberamo languages
Linguists of Tambora
Linguists of Abinomn
Linguists of Austronesian languages
Linguists of Sino-Tibetan languages
Writers from Portsmouth
Linguists from the United Kingdom
Linguists from Australia
Australian National University alumni
Academic staff of the Australian National University